The 1970 Iowa Hawkeyes football team represented the University of Iowa in the 1970 Big Ten Conference football season. Led by Ray Nagel in his fifth and final season as head coach, the Hawkeyes compiled an overall record of 3–6–1 with a mark of 3–3–1 in conference play, placing fourth in the Big Ten. The team played home games at Iowa Stadium in Iowa City, Iowa.

Schedule

Roster

Game summaries

USC

Wisconsin

    
    
    
    
    
    

Iowa sophomore quarterback Kyle Skogman started his first game.

at Michigan

References

Iowa
Iowa Hawkeyes football seasons
Iowa Hawkeyes football